Peter Kramer may refer to:

Peter D. Kramer (born 1948), American psychiatrist
Peter Kramer (physicist) (born 1933), German physicist
Peter Kramer (priest), German priest

See also 
 Piet Kramer (1881–1961), Dutch architect